DenTek Oral Care, Inc. is an American private company that develops, manufactures and markets oral care products, including Floss Picks, Interdental Brushes, Disposable Picks, Tongue Cleaners and Dental Guards. DenTek was founded in 1985 by John Jansheski. His father, Dr. John Jansheski invented an at-home tartar removal device, known to many as the dental pick. DenTek is a leader in American retail sales of manual dental tools and accessories.  Their products are available throughout the United States, Canada, Germany, and the UK.

References 

1984 establishments in the United States
Companies established in 1984
Companies based in Tennessee